Norman Keith Collins (January 14, 1911 – June 12, 1973), known popularly as Sailor Jerry, was a prominent American tattoo artist in Hawaii who was well known for his sailor tattoos.

Biography 
Norman Keith Collins was born on January 14, 1911, in Reno but grew up in Northern California. As a child he hopped freight trains across the country and learned tattooing from a man named "Big Mike" from Palmer, Alaska, originally using the hand-pricking method. In the late 1920s he met Tatts Thomas from Chicago who taught him how to use a tattoo machine.  He practiced on drunks brought in from Skid Row. He later sailed the Pacific Ocean before settling in Hawaii in the 1930s.

At age 19, Collins enlisted in the United States Navy. During his subsequent travels at sea, he was exposed to the art and imagery of Southeast Asia. During his career as a tattoo artist, he worked as a licensed skipper of a large three-masted schooner, on which he conducted tours of the Hawaiian islands.

In addition to sailing and tattooing, he played the saxophone in his own dance band and frequently hosted his own radio show, where he was known as "Old Ironsides".

Body artist

Sailor Jerry made significant contributions to the art of tattooing. He expanded the array of colors available by developing his own pigments. He created custom needle formations that embedded pigment with much less trauma to the skin. He became one of the first artists to utilize single-use needles. His tattoo studio was one of the first to use an autoclave to sterilize equipment.

Collin's last studio was at 1033 Smith Street in Honolulu's Chinatown, then the only place on the island where tattoo studios were located.

Among Sailor Jerry's most well known designs were:

 Bottles of booze
 Snakes
 Wildcats
 The infamous "Aloha" monkey
 Eagles, falcons and other birds of prey
 Swallows
 Motor heads and pistons
 Nautical stars
 Classically styled scroll banners
 Knives, guns and other weapons
 Dice
 Anchors
 Hawaii themes
 Pin-up girls

Legacy
Sailor Jerry's influence on the art of modern tattooing is widely recognized.

Sailor Jerry wanted at least one of three protégés/friends – Ed Hardy, Mike Malone, or Zeke Owen – to take over his shop (or else burn it) when he died.

Since 2015, an annual independently produced event now takes place in Hawaii every June called the "Sailor Jerry Festival" to honor Collins's legacy and Chinatown roots on Oahu. The multi-venue event includes live music, DJ's, cabaret performances, an art show - featured artists have included Sailor Jerry's great-grand niece Madison Thomas, local artists, and Masami Teraoka, movie screenings, a pin-up fashion show – where models wear outfits designed from Sailor Jerry flash, neighborhood tours, and tattoos available at three area shops, including Sailor Jerry's last location.
A portion of the proceeds from the event is donated every year to the Collins family by the festival founder (Jason Miller of 808shows.com/Hawaiian Express Records) and his co-host 'Josh86' (a popular musician and entrepreneur).

Image rights

In 1999, Ed Hardy and Mike Malone partnered with Steven Grasse from the Philadelphia-based creative agency, Quaker City Mercantile, to establish Sailor Jerry Ltd. The limited company, which owns the commercial rights to Collins' letters, art, and flash (tattoos), uses his designs on clothing and items such as ash trays, sneakers, playing cards, churchkeys and shot glasses. As an anti-sweatshop company, Sailor Jerry Ltd. produces nearly all its items in the United States and sells them from the company's web site. The company also showcases rising talents within the Tattoo industry in its "Artist Series" which it describes as a way to "keep Sailor Jerry's legacy alive and kicking".

Sailor Jerry Ltd. produces a 92proof spiced "navy rum" featuring a quintessential Sailor Jerry hula girl on the label. As the bottle is emptied, additional pin-up girls designed by Sailor Jerry are visible on the inner side of the label. The rum is distilled in the U.S. Virgin Islands. It takes its influence from Caribbean rum, which sailors would spice with flavors from the Far East and Asia. In 2010, the 40% ABV formula being sold in the United Kingdom was changed to include a less sweet taste in a move that was described as more "vanilla and caramel flavors".

None of Collins' family profit from his creations or the things that have come from them since. There is a legal disagreement as to his naming rights as initiated by Louise Collins.

Personal life
Sailor Jerry was married more than once and his widow Louise still resides in Hawaii, as do several of his children, grandchildren, and great-grandchildren.

He is buried in the National Memorial Cemetery of the Pacific, a military cemetery located in Punchbowl Crater in Honolulu.

References

External links
 Sailor Jerry Festival
 
 "Hori Smoku Sailor Jerry" (2008 documentary film)

1911 births
1973 deaths
American tattoo artists
Businesspeople from Reno, Nevada
United States Navy sailors
Burials in the National Memorial Cemetery of the Pacific
20th-century American businesspeople